Mesita is the musical project of James Cooley, a musician who grew up in Littleton, Colorado, and is now based in Brooklyn.

History
Cooley writes, performs, and produces all of the music under the Mesita moniker himself. The project began in 2008 when he released the debut album Cherry Blossoms. He released the album Here's To Nowhere in 2011 and The Coyote the following year. 2013 saw the release of the fourth full-length Mesita album Future Proof.

Mesita is featured on episodes of Skins (North American TV series) as well as Mistresses (U.S. TV series). The track "Somewhere Else" is featured on the first compilation from popular YouTube music channel Majestic Casual.

In 2020, Mesita contributed production with Monte Booker for the song "Judas" (with JID featuring Ari Lennox, Buddy, Chance the Rapper and Masego) on the album Spilligion by American hip hop collective Spillage Village.

Discography

Albums
Cherry Blossoms (June 17, 2008), self-released
Here's To Nowhere (March 25, 2011), self-released
The Coyote (April 3, 2012), self-released
Future Proof (October 8, 2013), self-released
The Phoenix (December 30, 2014), self-released
With Love, from Laniakea (June, 2016), self-released
Littleton (March, 2018), self-released
You Are Beautiful (September 30, 2019), self-released
Eat A** or Die Trying Deluxe (January 17, 2020), self-released
Empty Island (August 21, 2020), self-released
Life Is Flashing Before My Eyes One Day at a Time (April 6, 2021), self-released
You're Still Beautiful (October 29, 2021), self-released
am i still beautiful (May 13, 2022), self-released

EPs
No Worries EP (July 31, 2009), self-released
Living/Breathing EP (November 30, 2010), self-released
Small Table EP (February 16, 2016), self-released
Mall Music EP (March 15, 2017), self-released
Repackaged Trash EP (December 18, 2018), self-released
Blackwhite EP (October 17, 2019), self-released

References

External links 
 
 Mesita on Bandcamp
 Mesita on Facebook

Indie rock musical groups from Colorado
One-man bands